Camille Z. Charles is an American sociologist. She serves as Walter H. and Leonore C. Annenberg Professor in the Social Sciences, Professor of Sociology, Africana Studies & Education and Director of the Center for Africana Studies at the University of Pennsylvania. She served as the first chair of Penn's Africana Studies Department, founded in 2012.

Education 
Charles graduated from California State University-Sacramento, then earned a master's degree and a Ph.D. in sociology from the University of California at Los Angeles.

Works
 The Source of the River: The Social Origins of Freshmen at America's Selective Colleges and Universities with Douglas S. Massey, Garvey Lundy and Mary J. Fischer (Princeton University Press, 2003)
 Won't You Be My Neighbor? Race, Class and Residence in Los Angeles (Russell Sage, Fall 2006)
 Taming the River: Negotiating the Academic, Financial, and Social Currents in Selective Colleges and Universities with Mary J. Fischer, Margarita A. Mooney and Douglas S. Massey (Princeton University Press, 2009)
 "Race in the American Mind: From the Moynihan Report to the Obama Candidacy" with Lawrence Bobo

References

Living people
University of Pennsylvania people
University of Pennsylvania faculty
Walter H. Annenberg Professor
California State University, Sacramento alumni
University of California, Los Angeles alumni
American sociologists
American women sociologists
Year of birth missing (living people)
21st-century American women